West Croydon railway station is located on the Grange and Outer Harbor lines. Situated in the western Adelaide suburb of West Croydon, it is 5.1 kilometres from Adelaide station.

History
The West Croydon station was developed as a result of a meeting between local residents and the Railway Commissioner in 1914. Initially, the station was to be called York, after a nearby subdivision, but the naming was changed to its current form. In 1910 a subway was built in a grade separation project. The platforms were built over the subway and the station opened on 21 December 1915.

In March 1978, the building on Platform 1 was destroyed by fire, and the ticket office on that platform was immediately closed. The ticket office on Platform 2 closed on 12 December 1980. In 2016, a nearby primary school painted six large signs that were added to the station's south platform as part of a program to decorate stations across Adelaide. Two of the paintings are of Pokémon, while the third displays the continent of Australia.

Services by platform

References

External links

Railway stations in Adelaide
Railway stations in Australia opened in 1915